Corruption in Kuwait is a problem resulting in political tensions in society. Transparency International's 2021 Corruption Perception Index ranks the country in 73rd place out of the 180 countries in the Index, where countries with low rankings are perceived to have an honest public sector.

Kuwait's bureaucracy can be biased in favour of domestic companies. Public procurement process is susceptible to corruption, there are some ongoing investigations and trials involving government officials accused of wrongdoing in the procurement process.

Anti-corruption efforts 
The government has tried to reduce corruption and increase transparency in the public sector by establishing an independent anti-corruption authority and by strengthening the anti-corruption legal framework through several initiatives and efforts.

See also 
 Crime in Kuwait

References

External links
Kuwait Corruption Profile from the Business Anti-Corruption Portal

Kuwait
Politics of Kuwait
Society of Kuwait
Crime in Kuwait by type